Stephen Graham (born 1973) is an English film and television actor.

Stephen Graham may also refer to:

 Stephen Victor Graham (1874–1955), Governor of American Samoa, 1927–1929
 Stephen Graham (author) (1884–1975), British travel writer and novelist
 Stephen Graham Jones (born 1972), Native American author of experimental horror crime and science fiction
 Stephen Graham (basketball) (born 1982), American NBA basketball player
 Steve Graham (born 1962), Australian Paralympic winter sport coach

See also